The list of ship commissionings in 1977 includes a chronological list of all ships commissioned in 1977.


See also

Notes

References

1977
 Ship commissionings